Éric Stauffer, born on October 24, 1964 in Carouge, is a Swiss politician from Homberg. He chairs the Genevan Citizens Movement from 2008 to 2012 .

Early life and family 
Stauffer was born in Caprioli on 24 October 1964, to a Genevan father and an Italian-born mother, and grew up in Homberg, Bern. He married when he was 21, and married his current wife when he was 38. He has two children. His wife was born in Mauritius, and he has Italian and Mauritian as well as Swiss citizenship.

Professional career 

Éric Stauffer claims to have collaborated in the 1990s with the Federal Military Department, in particular the Spiez Laboratory, which specializes in the study of atomic, biological and chemical threats and risks related to weapons of mass destruction . Contacted by the newspaper Tribune de Genève as part of an investigation, the laboratory and the Federal Office of Police refuse to comment on this statement, neither confirming nor contradicting the statements of Eric Stauffer, in this case. The newspaper Le Temps also contacted the Swiss Confederation, quoting from the article: "On the other hand, we must insist that it give information on its activities in the years 1992 to 1994. It takes pleasure to play the suspense. "I collaborated with the Federal Military Department, I was active in everything related to weapons of mass destruction," he breathes. Should we believe it, when we know that the character revel in staging and is not afraid of overbidding? In Bern, we do not deny the information.

Around the year 2000, Éric Stauffer is active on the island of Mauritius where he advises his friend the Minister of Industry and Commerce Xavier Luc Duval. He leaves the island after being wrongly accused of heavy charges by Prime Minister Navim Ramgoolam. When he left, he transmitted information to the Mauritian media denouncing Prime Minister Navin Ramgoolam.

He also states that he collaborated with the Swiss Confederation in 2002 in organizing a peace conference in Switzerland between Israel and the Palestinian Authority.

In October 2003, he participated in the creation of the airline Helvetic Wings and became the chief financial officer, in disagreement with the shareholders of the company on the strategy of development he resigned in April 2004 after only 6 months of activity . In March 2006 Helvetic Wings goes bankrupt.

In 2010, Éric Stauffer founded with Carlos Medeiros a company active in the field of mobile telephony. Affiliated with the operator Sunrise, the company offered discounted offers to its customers. In January 2018, Sunrise acquired the company's business and the Medinex brand.

At the end of 2018, Éric Stauffer created a new telephone services company based in Valais.

Political career 

Partisan Path

Member of the Swiss Liberal Party in the 1980s he was first elected as City Councilor of the city of Onex (Geneve) during the legislature 1987-1991. Subsequently he joined the Democratic Union of the Center in the spring of 2005. A few weeks later, he founded with Georges Letellier, the June 6, 2005, the Blochérien Genevois Movement (MBG), which quickly decided to change its name by adopting the Mouvement des citoyens genevois (MCG). The new formation of Eric Stauffer is very quickly known by two broadcasts of the RTS (Radio Television Switzerland) Infrared where he is invited against Joseph Deiss Federal Councilor.

In October 2005, the CWM reached a quorum of 7% and won 9 deputies, Eric Stauffer is elected Deputy to the Grand Council of the Republic and Canton of Geneva under the label of the Mouvement Citizens Genevois.

Éric Stauffer is elected on February 20, 2008 by the General Assembly of the CWM as President. Roger Golay replaces him on April 28, 2012.

In 2016, he again seeks the presidency of the movement against Ana Roch . He loses this election with a voice and announces in the wake his withdrawal from politics  , .

In 2017 Éric Stauffer launches the "Geneva on the move" (GEM) movement with a view to the cantonal elections of 2018  , ,.

Following his non-reelection at the Geneva Grand Council, Eric Stauffer announces the dissolution of his "Geneva on the Move" movement and its withdrawal from political life.

In 2018, he moved to Valais.

Political activities - commune of Onex

Councilor of the municipality of Onex, during the municipal elections of April 29, 2007 and for the first time in the political history of Geneva Eric Stauffer candidate for the Administrative Council in Onex, causes a second round where he is finally preceded by the Christian Democrat candidate Philippe Rochat. The April 17, 2011 he was elected to the Onex Administrative Council by ousting Rochat . He is mayor of the commune for the year 2013 - 2014. The April 19, 2015 in the first round of the municipal elections, he was only in fourth position in the election of the Administrative Council, behind the PLR candidate François Mumenthaler. In the second round, an unprecedented alliance between the PLR-Radical Liberal Party and the Socialist Party with the Greens and the PDC, which make a joint list against Eric Stauffer who is alone, achieves almost 38% of the vote, on May 10 he is beaten and loses his seat.

Political activities - Grand Council of the Canton of Geneva

He presents his candidacy for the election of the Grand Council of the Canton of Geneva in October 2005 . Elected deputy, he unsuccessfully quarrels on November 13 a seat in the Council of State but ahead of the two candidates of the Democratic Union of the center of several thousand votes  .

The October 11, 2009 he is re-elected by leading the list of his party, which doubles his representation to become the third party of the canton. In the process, he launched his candidacy for the Council of State alongside Mauro Poggia : both are not elected on November 15, Stauffer being preceded by Poggia by some 2,400 votes.

In October 2010 Eric Stauffer designs a poster as part of a federal vote on the removal of foreign criminals or is pictured Colonel Gaddafi with the slogan "He wants to destroy Switzerland."

Libya will lodge a complaint with the Swiss Confederation against Eric Stauffer, the case made a lot of noise in the Swiss media.

Eric Stauffer will be the subject of a federal criminal procedure (a rarity in Switzerland) for "contempt of foreign Head of State". Federal Council gives permission to prosecute Eric Stauffer, Statement of Federal Councilor Simonetta Somaruga of the National Council 2013 Summer Session Sixth Sitting 10.06.13 14.30. At first the Public Ministry of the Swiss Confederation pronounces a sequestration of the posters. Some 8 months after the start of the lawsuit against Eric Stauffer the Arab Spring will cause the dismissal of the regime of Gaddafi who will be placed under international arrest warrant to be tried before the International Criminal Tribunal for the Hague, Kadhafi will be assassinated, the Public Ministry of Confederation will abandon the lawsuits against Eric Stauffer, Eric Stauffer will even get a victory at the Federal Court on this case.

In 2011 at the Municipalities Eric Stauffer President of the MCG achieves a breakthrough from three municipalities with elected representatives to 16 municipalities and propels the GCM to the rank of 2 nd cantonal party just behind the PLR.

Eric Stauffer is one of the few Swiss politicians to have hit the headlines, the flagship show of the RTS "Temps Présent" devotes a report - Populism manual - November 10, 2011.

The February 29, 2012, he is nominated by the GCM for the complementary election to the Council of State, to replace State Councilor Mark Muller, who resigned  . He is again candidate in 2013, presented by his party with Delphine Perrella-Gabus and Mauro Poggia. On 6 October he was re-elected to the Grand Council. The same day, he must abandon his ambitions to access the cantonal government. Indeed, he obtains 5 579 votes less than Poggia, who remains the only candidate in the running for the MCG .

In 2016, after his failure to take over the chairmanship of the CWM, Éric Stauffer announced his resignation from the Grand Council but reconsidered this decision and sits from June 2016 as "independent"  . In September 2017, he announced the creation of the new party "Geneva en marche"  . However, in the elections to the Grand Council, April 15, 2018 Geneva on the move gets only 4.1% of the vote, which does not allow it to get seats. On an individual level, he is not elected as a State Councilor .

Alert and denunciations 

Mauritian Affair
 
In 1999 Eric Stauffer founded in Mauritius with Xavier Luc Duval a management company Equinoxe Financial Services Ltd. A few months later in a by-election helped by Eric Stauffer, Xavier Luc Duval is elected and becomes Minister of Industry and Trade and Deputy Prime Minister of Mauritius. As for Eric Stauffer he becomes Special Advisor to the Mauritian Minister Xavier Luc Duval who occupies the function of Minister of Industry and Trade.

Navin Ramgoolam then prime minister is afraid that the Swiss Eric Stauffer may know that money has been diverted from the Mauritian government to the Geneva-based UOB bank in Geneva.

At that time, Erton Assets Management SA, of which Eric Stauffer is the main shareholder and the liquidator, presented the Mauritian minister to the UOB. The document internal to the bank is very clear on this subject: "The appointment was organized on the initiative of the contributor Erton (...) in order to finalize a possible entry into relationship, which could lead to a deposit of 25 millions of dollars."

The conclusion of this contract involved the payment of bribes. This is why Eric Stauffer and his company Erton give up. Yet Eric Stauffer is convinced that the UOB has nevertheless accepted the offer, but "on my back, to avoid having to pay me commissions.But especially because, by paying these commissions, the bank would recognize that it has accepted all the illicit aspects of this case ".

An internal UEB document, published by the Geneva Tribune, could revive the case. This document proves that contacts did indeed take place in 1997 between the bank and the Mauritian finance minister at the time. We learn how the minister proposed to the UOB (former name of the UEB) to finance the electoral campaign of his party in the year 2000.

Eric Stauffer denounces a scandal and leaves Mauritius and many articles in the press relates this, henceforth, national scandal.

After a fierce war and a press release from the Swiss Confederation disavowing Prime Minister Navin Ramgolam, the opposition seizes power at an early election, Eric Stauffer is invited as a hero to Mauritius where he is inducted citizen of honor and receives Mauritian nationality.

Charges Against Industrial Services

Éric Stauffer, as a Member of Parliament, has served for several years on the Board of Directors of the Geneva Industrial Services (SIG).

In 2007, he fights what he sees as the "productivist logic of the incineration furnace of the Cheneviers factory in Geneva" in the name of public health, finding it absurd to have waste all over Europe to feed Geneva oversized incinerators!

Robert Cramer State Councilor for Environment in Geneva announces the next import of waste from Naples for incineration in Geneva, stauffer organizes a press conference in Naples to denounce the import of Neapolitan waste in Geneva and worries about questionable channels between the Italian mafia and the (SIG) in the passage it provokes the Italian government affirming that some members would work in the pay of the mafia Sources; the Italian government denies it by saying: "we have never authorized the export of our waste to Geneva or Switzerland".

In the same year he protested against the GIS remuneration system by tabling a parliamentary motion.  In 2008, it is malpractices he denounces without continuation  : he evokes his revelations on the basis of a report by Claude Marcet former CFO of GIS and member of the Board of Directors of SIG- attesting that Gaznat, a subsidiary of GIS specializing in gas, allegedly falsified its accounts in the 1990s to conceal dumping of its tariffs and "sink mazoutiers"; the operation would have made it necessary to clean up Gaznat up to 74 million francs payable by the taxpayer of Geneva. He also denounced the payment by SGI of funds to Energy West Switzerland for financing through EOS Energie Ouest Switzerland where the SGI are shareholders of the Grande Dixence dam in Valais, ie 100 million francs.

At the beginning of March 2009, the Council of State revoked its mandate of administrator of the SGI for violation of the duties related to its function, in particular the duty of loyalty, decision against which it appeals before the Administrative Court of Geneva  on the ground that the only loyalty recognized by Eric Stauffer and the loyalty of the people who elected him! The latter rejects its request for suspensive effect by May 19, 2009  . The Federal Court confirms the decision of the Administrative Court by judgment of August 3, 2009, considering in particular that his dismissal can not cause him irreparable harm, a necessary condition for his appeal to be admissible. Éric Stauffer then denounces a "political cabal ".

Controversies and court cases

In 2013, Éric Stauffer staged a production filmed  to show that young people can very easily buy drugs in Geneva. He has cocaine bought during a political communication operation to demonstrate the ease of buying drugs in the Pâquis neighborhood and the lack of control by the authorities. Once the scene of the filmed purchase Eric Stauffer calls Police Emergency shows the images of the dealers, and this one will be arrested and sentenced. The Attorney General does not like Eric Stauffer's way of doing things and charges him with the charge of "drug dealer", he will be sentenced at first instance in 2015 by the Police Court to a 45-day fine for breach of the Federal Law on Narcotic Drugs. Eric Stauffer appeal against this conviction and wins at the court of appeal he is acquitted. The Attorney General appeals the decision to the Federal Court (TF) which in a judgment confirms the acquittal of Eric Stauffer on May 9, 2018.

Humor

In 2015, Eric Stauffer receives the "Genferei Prize" awarded by the political journalists of Geneva.

References

External links 
 Official website

1964 births
Living people
Politicians from Geneva
Swiss civil servants